Eduard Reingoldovich Rapp (born 7 March 1951) is a retired Soviet cyclist who mostly competed on track in the 1 km time trial. In this event he won five medals at the world championships in 1971–79 and placed eighth at the 1972 Summer Olympics.

References

1951 births
Living people
Soviet male cyclists
Olympic cyclists of the Soviet Union
Cyclists at the 1972 Summer Olympics
Cyclists at the 1976 Summer Olympics
Sportspeople from Omsk